A list of animated feature films that were first released in 1973.

See also
 List of animated television series of 1973

References

Feature films
1973
1973-related lists